The tundra swan (Cygnus columbianus) is a small swan of the Holarctic. The two taxa within it are usually regarded as conspecific, but are also sometimes split into two species: Bewick's swan (Cygnus bewickii) of the Palaearctic and the whistling swan (C. columbianus) proper of the Nearctic. Birds from eastern Russia (roughly east of the Taymyr Peninsula) are sometimes separated as the subspecies C. c. jankowskii, but this is not widely accepted as distinct, with most authors including them in C. c. bewickii. Tundra swans are sometimes separated in the subgenus Olor together with the other Arctic swan species.

Bewick's swan was named in 1830 by William Yarrell after the engraver Thomas Bewick, who specialised in illustrations of birds and animals. Cygnus is the Latin for "swan", and  columbianus comes from the Columbia River, the type locality.

Description

In adult birds, the plumage of both subspecies is entirely white, with black feet, and a bill that is mostly black, with a thin salmon-pink streak running along the mouthline and – depending on the subspecies – more or less yellow in the proximal part. The iris is dark brown. In birds living in waters that contains large amounts of iron ions (e.g. bog lakes), the head and neck plumage acquires a golden or rusty hue. Pens (females) are slightly smaller than cobs (males), but do not differ in appearance otherwise.

Immatures of both subspecies are white mixed with some dull grey feathering, mainly on the head and upper neck, which are often entirely light grey; their first-summer plumage is quite white already, and in their second winter they moult into the adult plumage. Their bills are black with a large dirty-pink patch taking up most of the proximal half and often black nostrils, and their feet are dark grey with a pinkish hue. Downy young are silvery grey above and white below.

Bewick's swans are the smaller subspecies. There is a slight size cline, with the eastern birds being slightly larger; good measurement data only exists for the western populations however. The tarsus measures  in length, the bill , averaging . Bewick's swan is similar in appearance to the parapatric whooper swan (C. cygnus), but is smaller, shorter-necked and has a more rounded head shape, with variable bill pattern, but always showing more black than yellow and having a blunt forward edge of the yellow base patch. Whooper swans have a bill that has more yellow than black and the forward edge of the yellow patch is usually pointed. The bill pattern for every individual Bewick's swan is unique, and scientists often make detailed drawings of each bill and assign names to the swans to assist with studying these birds. The eastern birds, apart from being larger, tend towards less yellow on the bill, perhaps indicating that gene flow across Beringia, while marginal, never entirely ceased. An apparent case of hybridization between a Bewick's and a vagrant whistling swan has been reported from eastern Siberia.

C. c. columbianus is distinguished from C. c. bewickii by its larger size and the mostly black bill, with just a small and usually hard to see yellow spot of variable size at the base. It is distinguished from the largely allopatric trumpeter swan (C. buccinator) of North America by that species' much larger size and particularly long bill, which is black all over except for the pink mouthline, which is stronger than in the whistling swan.

Note that color variations with more or less yellow, or pink instead of yellow or black, are not exceptional, especially in Bewick's swans, which very rarely may even have yellowish feet. The small size and particularly the rather short neck, which make it look like a large white goose, are still distinguishing marks.

Tundra swans have high-pitched honking calls and sound similar to a black goose (Branta). They are particularly vocal when foraging in flocks on their wintering grounds; any conspecific arriving or leaving will elicit a bout of loud excited calling from its fellows. Contrary to its common name, the ground calls of the whistling swan are not a whistle and neither notably different from that of Bewick's swan. The flight call of the latter is a low and soft ringing bark, bow-wow...; the whistling swan gives a markedly high-pitched trisyllabic bark like wow-wow-wow in flight. By contrast, the whooper and trumpeter swans' names accurately describe their calls—a deep hooting and a higher-pitched French horn-like honk, respectively. Flying birds of these species are shorter-necked and have a quicker wingbeat than their relatives, but they are often impossible to tell apart except by their calls.

Distribution

As their common name implies, the tundra swan breeds in the tundra of the Arctic and subarctic, where they inhabit shallow pools, lakes and rivers. These birds, unlike mute swans (C. olor) but like the other Arctic swans, are migratory birds. The winter habitat of both subspecies is grassland and marshland, often near the coast; they like to visit fields after harvest to feed on discarded grains and while on migration may stop over on mountain lakes.

The breeding range of C. c. bewickii extends across the coastal lowlands of Siberia, from the Kola Peninsula east to the Pacific. They start to arrive on the breeding grounds around mid-May, and leave for winter quarters around the end of September. The populations west of the Taymyr Peninsula migrate via the White Sea, Baltic Sea and the estuary of the Elbe to winter in Denmark, the Netherlands and the British Isles. They are common in winter in the wildfowl nature reserves of the Royal Society for the Protection of Birds and of the Wildfowl & Wetlands Trust. Some birds also winter elsewhere on the southern shores of the North Sea. Bewick's swans breeding in eastern Russia migrate via Mongolia and northern China to winter in the coastal regions of Korea, Japan, and southern China, south to Guangdong and occasionally as far as Taiwan. A few birds from the central Siberian range also winter in Iran at the south of the Caspian Sea; in former times these flocks also migrated to the Aral Sea before the late 20th century ecological catastrophe turned most of the habitat there into inhospitable wasteland. Arrival in winter quarters starts about mid-October, though most spend weeks or even months at favorite resting locations and will only arrive in winter quarters by November or even as late as January. The birds leave winter quarters to breed starting in mid-February. Vagrants may occur south of the main wintering range in cold years and have been recorded from most European countries where the birds do not regularly winter, as well as Algeria, Iraq, Palestine, Libya, Nepal, northeast Pakistan, and on the Mariana and Volcano Islands in the western Pacific. Vagrants on the spring migration have been sighted on Bear Island, Iceland and Svalbard, and in Alaska, Oregon and Saskatchewan in North America.

C. c. columbianus breeds in the coastal plains of Alaska and Canada, leaving for winter quarters about October. They arrive in winter quarters by November/December. Birds breeding in western Alaska winter along the Pacific coast from southern Alaska to California; they often move inland – particularly to the rich feeding grounds in the Central Valley – and some cross the Rocky Mountains again and winter as far east as Utah and south to Texas and northern Mexico. The birds breeding along the Arctic Ocean coast migrate via Canada and the Great Lakes region to winter at the Atlantic coast of the United States, mainly from Maryland to North Carolina, but some move as far south as Florida. Whistling swans start leaving for the breeding grounds again by mid-March, and arrive by late May. Vagrants have been recorded on the Bermudas, Cuba the Hawaiian Islands, Puerto Rico, and in England, Ireland, Japan, northeastern Siberia and Sweden.

Ecology and biology

Diet
In summer, their diet consists mainly of aquatic vegetation—e.g. mannagrass (Glyceria), Potamogeton pondweeds and marine eelgrass (Zostera), acquired by sticking the head underwater or upending while swimming; they also eat some grass growing on dry land. At other times of year, leftover grains and other crops such as potatoes, picked up in open fields after harvest, make up much of their diet. Tundra swans forage mainly by day. In the breeding season, they tend to be territorial and are aggressive to many animals who pass by; outside the breeding season they are rather gregarious birds.

Natural predator
Healthy adult birds have few natural predators. The Arctic fox (Vulpes lagopus) may threaten breeding females and particular the eggs and hatchlings. Adults typically can stand their ground and displace foxes but occasionally the foxes are successful. Another surprisingly serious nest predator for tundra swans are brown bears (Ursus arctos), which were apparently the primary cause of nesting failure in both the Arctic National Wildlife Refuge and Izembek National Wildlife Refuge. Other potential nest predators include red fox (Vulpes vulpes), golden eagles (Aquila chrysaetos), parasitic jaegers (Stercorarius parasiticus), and glaucous gull (Larus hyperboreus). Brown bear, golden eagles and, rarely, gray wolves (Canis lupus) may on occasion succeed at capturing and killing an adult. Small or avian predators usually elicit either an aggressive response or the behavior of sitting tight on nests while larger mammals, perhaps more dangerous to adults, usually elicit the response of leading the cygnets into deep waters and standing still until they pass. About 15% of the adults die each year from various causes, and thus the average lifespan in the wild is about 10 years. The oldest recorded tundra swan was over 24 years old.

Reproduction

The tundra swans mate in the late spring, usually after they have returned to the nesting grounds; as usual for swans, they pair monogamously until one partner dies. Should one partner die long before the other, the surviving bird often will not mate again for some years, or even for its entire life. The nesting season starts at the end of May. The pair build the large mound-shaped nest from plant material at an elevated site near open water, and defend a large territory around it. The pen (female) lays and incubates a clutch of 2–7 (usually 3–5) eggs, watching for danger while sitting on the nest. The cob (male) keeps a steady lookout for potential predators heading towards his mate and offspring. When either of them spots a threat, they give a warning sound to let their partner know that danger is approaching. Sometimes the cob will use his wings to run faster and appear larger in order to scare away a predator.

The time from laying to hatching is 29–30 days for Bewick's swan and 30–32 days for the whistling swan. Since they nest in cold regions, tundra swan cygnets grow faster than those of swans breeding in warmer climates; those of the whistling swan take about 60–75 days to fledge—twice as fast as those of the mute swan for example—while those of Bewick's swan, about which little breeding data is known, may fledge a record 40–45 days after hatching already. The fledglings stay with their parents for the first winter migration. The family is sometimes even joined by their offspring from previous breeding seasons while on the wintering grounds; Tundra swans do not reach sexual maturity until 3 or 4 years of age.

Conservation status

The whistling swan is the most common swan species of North America, estimated to number almost 170,000 individuals around 1990. Its numbers seem to be slowly declining in the west of its range since the late 19th century, coincident with the expansion of human settlement and habitat conversion in the birds' wintering areas; the eastern whistling swan populations on the other hand seem to be increasing somewhat, and altogether its numbers seem to have slightly risen in the late 20th century (the population was estimated at about 146,000 in 1972). Bewick's swan remains far less known; although its population is in decline in northwestern Europe, for currently unexplained reasons. The European winter population was estimated at 16,000–17,000 about 1990, with about 20,000 birds wintering in east Asia. The Iranian wintering population is small—1,000 birds or so at most—but they usually disperse to several sites, some of which are still unknown to scientists.

Although tundra swan numbers are stable over most of its range, they are increasingly dependent on agricultural crops to supplement their winter diet, as aquatic vegetation in their winter habitat dwindles due to habitat destruction and water pollution. But the main cause of adult mortality is hunting; 4,000 whistling swans are bagged officially each year, while a further 6,000–10,000 are killed by poachers and native subsistence hunter-gatherers. Bewick's swan cannot be hunted legally, but almost half the birds studied contained lead shot in their body, indicating they were shot at by poachers. Lead poisoning by ingestion of lead shot is a very significant cause of mortality also, particularly in the whistling swan. The tundra swan is not considered threatened by the International Union for Conservation of Nature (IUCN) due to its large range and population. The proposed subspecies jankowskii was for some time placed on CITES Appendix II; it was eventually removed since it is not generally accepted as valid.

Bewick's swan is one of the birds to which the Agreement on the Conservation of African-Eurasian Migratory Waterbirds (AEWA) applies.

Toxic mining wastes in the Silver Valley, Idaho in the United States has been known to be responsible for the death of migrating tundra swans.

Gallery

References

Further reading

External links

 RSPB Bewick's Swan Page
 Tundra Swan
 Stamps of Cygnus columbianus with Circumpolar Range map at bird-stamps.org
 
 
 

Tundra swan
tundra swan
Holarctic birds
tundra swan
Taxa named by George Ord